Mount Kimball can refer to:

 Mount Kimball (Alaska)
 Mount Kimball (Arizona)
 Mount Kimball (Colorado)